Royal Air was a charter airline based in Cotonou, Benin. Its main base was Cadjehoun Airport. As of July, 2012, it is no longer in business

Fleet
The Royal Air fleet included the following aircraft (as of 19 July 2009):

1 Boeing 727-100

See also		
 List of defunct airlines of Benin

References

External links
Royal Air Fleet 

Defunct airlines of Benin
Airlines disestablished in 2012
Defunct charter airlines
Companies based in Cotonou